Karaurín-tepui, also spelled Caraurín, is a tepui of the Eastern Tepuis chain in Bolívar state, Venezuela. The foothills of the tepui are covered in forests. Karaurín-tepui lies just south of the much larger Ilú–Tramen Massif.

See also
 Distribution of Heliamphora

References

Tepuis of Venezuela
Mountains of Venezuela
Mountains of Bolívar (state)